Robert L. Wynn (January 27, 1940 – May 18, 2005) was an American professional golfer who played on the PGA Tour and the Champions Tour.

Wynn was born in Lancaster, Kentucky. He turned pro in 1966. His victory at the 1976 B.C. Open was his only career win in a PGA Tour event. Wynn's final-round of 69 was enough to give him a one-stroke victory over Bob Gilder in that tournament. He had 17 career top-10 finishes in PGA Tour events. His best finish in a major championship was T24 at The Masters in 1977.

After reaching the age of 50 in 1990, Wynn joined the Senior PGA Tour, where had one career win, the 1993 NYNEX Commemorative. In 1997, he earned $177,874, and finished 2nd in the BankBoston Classic. He last played competitively in 2002, and ended with 12 top-10 finishes in Senior PGA Tour events.

Wynn lived in La Quinta, California and died in Loma Linda, California from lung cancer.

Professional wins (8)

PGA Tour wins (1)

Other wins (6)
 1970 Ohio Open
 1971 Ohio Open
 1972 Ohio Open
 1975 Magnolia State Classic
 1978 Belgian Omnium
 1983 Northern California PGA Championship

Senior PGA Tour wins (1)

U.S. national team appearances
PGA Cup: 1984

References

External links

American male golfers
PGA Tour golfers
PGA Tour Champions golfers
Golfers from Kentucky
People from Lancaster, Kentucky
Sportspeople from Riverside County, California
People from La Quinta, California
Deaths from lung cancer in California
1940 births
2005 deaths